George Sutton Snook (September 1, 1842 – July 31, 1894) was the sixth and twelfth President of the Chico Board of Trustees, the governing body of Chico, California from 1885 to 1886 and from 1892 to 1894.

Early life and family 
Snook was born in Aurora, Indiana, on September 1, 1842, the son of Isaac Snook, a native of Pennsylvania and Elizabeth Sopris Snook. He was educated in Indiana in the trade of coopersmithing. He worked in this trade for three years before the American Civil War erupted.

Civil War military service 
Snook was eighteen at the outbreak of the American Civil War, and in May 1861, he enlisted in Company C of the 12th Indiana Infantry Regiment. He served for ten months, and reenlisted in Company H of the 10th Regiment Indiana Cavalry under General Wilson. He participated in all the battles engaged by the Western army. He escaped injury, received several promotions, and when discharged at Vicksburg, in August, 1865, was Captain of his company.

Life after the war 
After his service,  he went to Illinois for three years where he engaged in farming. In 1868, he came to Chico, California where he was initially employed in the lumber industry. He was then engaged in an express business for seven years.

On September 20, 1870, he was married to Miss Amanda Jane Sliger, a native of Missouri, who came to California in her girlhood. The same year, he purchased a home on the corner of Wall and Fourth streets.

He enlisted in the Chico Guard, a unit of the 5th Brigade of the California Militia on November 10, 1880 as a Sergeant.

In 1883, he entered into the livery business with a partner.

On December 10, 1883 he reenlisted in the Chico Guard.

In December 1885, his establishment was destroyed by fire. He then formed a partnership with a Mr. White, continuing in the livery business.

On April 23, 1886, he, again, reenlisted in the Chico Guard and again on December 10, 1886.

He attained the rank of Captain and Aide-de-camp to the Commander of the 5th Brigade on March 7, 1887. He eventually attained the rank of Major of the Fifth Brigade and Brigade Inspector.

In 1889 Mr. Clark, purchased Mr. White’s interest, and they continued in business until at least 1891.

He is buried in the Chico Cemetery.

Associations 
 First Commander of the Post, Grand Army of the Republic
 Member, Military Order of the Loyal Legion of the United States
 Member, Independent Order of Odd Fellows
 Member, Ancient Order of United Workmen
 Member, Improved Order of Red Men
 Member, Chico Volunteer Fire Department

References 

1842 births
1894 deaths
American firefighters
American militiamen
California city council members
Mayors of Chico, California
People from Aurora, Indiana
Union Army soldiers
19th-century American politicians
Grand Army of the Republic officials